HMS Ardent was a Royal Navy 27 knot torpedo boat destroyer ordered from John I Thornycroft & Company under the 1893 – 1894 Naval Estimates.  She was the sixth ship to carry this name.

Construction and design
On 12 October 1893, the British Admiralty placed an order for three torpedo boat destroyers (Ardent,  and ) with the shipbuilder Thornycroft under the 1893–1894 shipbuilding programme for the Royal Navy as a follow-on to the two prototype destroyers ( and ) ordered from Thornycroft under the 1892–1893 programme.

As a torpedo boat, the planned armament was a single QF 12 pounder 12 cwt ( calibre) gun on a platform on the ship's conning tower (in practice the platform was also used as the ship's bridge), together with a secondary gun armament of three 6-pounder guns, and two 18 in (450 mm) torpedo tubes. As a gunboat, one of the torpedo tubes could be removed to accommodate a further two six-pounders.

Displacement was  light and  full load. Two funnels were fitted.

Ardent was laid down as Yard number 297 in December 1893 at the Thornycroft shipyard at Church Wharf, Chiswick and launched on 16 October 1894 by Mrs C.T. Cornish, the daughter of the company founder John Isaac Thornycroft. During her builder's trials at Maplin Sound on 9 November 1894 the ship achieved an average speed of 29.182 knots on her full power run. Her boiler pressure was 210 pounds per square inch with shafts turning at an average of 407 revolutions per minute. Ardent was completed on 25 March 1895.

Service history
The torpedo boat destroyer was commissioned into the Royal Navy on 30 April 1895 at Portsmouth under the command of Lieutenant & Commander Godfrey H B Mundy for service on the Mediterranean Station based at Malta. Ardent departed Portsmouth on 14 May 1895, stopping at Plymouth to join the third-class cruiser .  They departed for Malta on 15 May 1895. Upon her arrival she became tender to the fleet flagship, the battleship . Among Ardent′s duties was the training of stokers in the management of water-tube boilers.

On 31 March 1901, Ardent was listed as being at Malta for the British Empire census. In April 1902 she was on tactical and gunnery exercises with the Mediterranean Fleet, and in September that year she was part of a squadron visiting the Aegean Sea for combined manoeuvres near Nauplia and Souda Bay at Crete. She paid off at Gibraltar on 22 October 1902. On 17 April 1906, the torpedo boat  was in collision with Ardent while carrying out exercises at night off Malta. TB 84 sank, with one of her crew being killed in the accident.

Upon her return to home waters in early 1911, Ardent was paid off into reserve.  She was listed on the July 1911 (Quarterly) Navy List as being for sale.  Ardent was sold on 10 October 1911 for breaking, raising a price of £1400.

Notes

Citations

References

Further reading
 
 
 
 

 

Ships built in Chiswick
1894 ships
Destroyers of the Royal Navy
Maritime incidents in 1906
Ships built by John I. Thornycroft & Company
Ardent-class destroyers